Thomas Foster Tipton (August 29, 1833 – February 7, 1904) was a U.S. Representative from Illinois.

Biography
Thomas F. Tipton was born near Harrisburg, Ohio on August 29, 1833. He attended the public schools.
He moved with his parents to McLean County, Illinois, in 1843.
He read law, was admitted to the bar in 1854, and began working as a lawyer.

He served as state attorney for the eighth judicial district of Illinois in 1867 and 1868.

Tipton was elected circuit judge of the eighth judicial circuit in 1870, and upon the reorganization of the circuit court under the new constitution was reelected circuit judge of the fourteenth judicial circuit.

Tipton was elected as a Republican to the Forty-fifth Congress (March 4, 1877 – March 3, 1879).
He was an unsuccessful candidate for reelection in 1878 to the Forty-sixth Congress.

Tipton was again elected circuit judge and served from 1891 to 1897.
He resumed the practice of law.
He died in Bloomington, McLean County, Illinois, February 7, 1904, and was interred in Evergreen Cemetery.

References

External links
Thomas F. Tipton - McLean County Museum of History

1833 births
1904 deaths
Illinois state court judges
Republican Party members of the United States House of Representatives from Illinois
19th-century American politicians
People from Harrisburg, Ohio
19th-century American judges